New York's 51st State Senate district is one of 63 districts in the New York State Senate. It has  been represented by Republican Peter Oberacker since 2021, succeeding fellow Republican James L. Seward.

Geography
District 51 is a convoluted district in Central New York and the Hudson Valley, covering all of Schoharie, Otsego, and Cortland Counties, as well as parts of Tompkins, Herkimer, Chenango, Cayuga, Delaware, and Ulster Counties.

The district overlaps with New York's 18th, 19th, and 21st, and with the 101st, 102nd, 103rd, 118th, 119th, 121st, 122nd, 125th, and 126th districts of the New York State Assembly.

Recent election results

2020

2018

2016

2014

2012

Federal results in District 51

References

51